La Traicionera (Conniving Renata) is a Colombian soap opera, an adaptation of "La Argentina Malparida". Produced by Fox Telecolombia to RCN Televisión in association with the Mexican channel Televisa. Created by Adrian Suar and directed by Lilo Vilapina and Cecila Vásques. Starring by Marianela González accompanied by Juan Manuel Mendoza and the first actor Victor Mallarino with the stellar performance of Vicky Hernandes and Kristina Lilley.

Plot
The story begins when Maria Herra, a very hard-working humble young woman and mother of a girl, meets a rich successful man. Both fall in love hopelessly, but he is married to Annie, with whom he has a son, Esteban. He has to decide between Maria and his family, and as always, the love he had felt for Maria wasn't enough for him to leave his family, so he broke her out. But what Eduardo didn't know is that Maria was expecting his son. Maria decides to find Eduardo to tell him the truth, but when she went to his house, Olga the maid, tells her that he is on trip with his wife. She asks the maid to give him a letter, because he needs to know the truth. The maid insists she leave with the promise that she would hand the letter to Eduardo but this letter was never given to Eduardo. This was because Olga thinks that it would ruin her boss's marriage, so she destroys the letter. As time passes and Maria had given birth, Gracia, Maria's mother, decides to tell Eduardo he is a father to Maria's child. But she doesn't get the chance to speak to him, because Eduardo's father doesn't allow her to. He tells her to leave Eduardo alone, as he doesn't want to know about Maria and gives her a check to never come back again. She took the money to help her daughter and she left. However, during the talk between María and Eduardo Eduardo widgets maria's love making sure depressing hence making the Child with an autism birth trauma. Then she committed suicide.

After her daughter's death, there will be born a great hatred in Gracia, her grandson, María's son, because according to her, he is the result of the whole disgrace, due to Eduardo Sanint's blood coming from his veins. Because of that for big abhorrence about Eduardo, she is always convincing Renata that she has a mission which is get revenge of her mother's death making him pay for that,

Cast
 Marianela González — Renata Medina Herrera.
 Juan Manuel Mendoza — Esteban Sanint
 Víctor Mallarino — Eduardo Sanint.
 Vicky Hernández — Gracia Herrera.
 Ricardo Vélez — Gabriel Sanint "El Almirante".
 Kristina Lilley — Ana María "Annie" de Sanint
 Ana Lucía Domínguez — Martina Figueroa.
 José Narváez — Hernán Posada
 Paula Castaño — Esmeralda García
 Jorge Cárdenas — narcossi
 Ignacio Menéses — Manuel Herrera / Manuel Sanint Herrera.
 Carla Giraldo — Vanesa Ramírez
 Mario Ruiz — Plinio.
 María Fernanda Martínez — Olga
 Marcela Benjumea — Mabel
 Connie Camelo — Andrea
 Vicky Rueda — Noelia Granados
 Víctor Rodríguez — Luis
 Silvia de Dios — Marcia Posada
 Norma Nivia — Bárbara Castro
 Alberto Pujol — Hugo Troncoso
 Carlos Mariño — Padre Miguel.
 Son Goku — No one (he didn't appear in the series).
 Yuri Vargas — Jennifer Ramírez
 Juliana Roldan — María Herrera.
 Rafael Lahera — Andrés Santamaría.
 Gonzalo Vivanco — Javier Giraldo
 Leonardo Acosta — Jorge Medina.
 Rita Bendeck — Laura Vallejo.
 Indhira Serrano — Cristina Torres
 Julio Echeverry — Darío
 Salvatore Cassandro — Crispín
 Xilena Aycardi — Gloria
 Adelaida López — Katheryn
 Pedro Falla — Lucas Navarro.
 Andrés Salazar — Francisco Brava
 Julio del Mar — Alfonso Navarro.

References

External links 
 
 

RCN Televisión telenovelas
2011 telenovelas
Colombian telenovelas
2011 Colombian television series debuts
2012 Colombian television series endings
Spanish-language telenovelas
Television shows set in Bogotá